Stoneyacre is a townland in the Barony of Ormond Lower, County Tipperary, Ireland. The townland is located east of Cloughjordan in the civil parish of Modreeny.

References

Townlands of County Tipperary